Joseph Hampton Moore (March 8, 1864 – May 2, 1950) was the 108th and 111th
 Mayor of Philadelphia and a Republican member of the United States House of Representatives from Pennsylvania.

Biography
J. Hampton Moore was born in Woodbury, New Jersey. He worked as a reporter on the Philadelphia Public Ledger and the Court Combination from 1881 to 1894.  He was chief clerk to the city treasurer of Philadelphia from 1894 to 1897 and secretary to the mayor in 1900.  He served as president of the Allied Republican Clubs of Philadelphia, of the Pennsylvania State League, and of the National League of Republican Clubs from 1900 to 1906.  He worked as city treasurer from 1901 to 1903.  He was appointed by President Theodore Roosevelt as the first Chief of the Bureau of Manufactures, Department of Commerce and Labor, in January 1905, but resigned after six months' service to become president of a Philadelphia bank.  He was president of the Atlantic Deeper Waterways Association from 1907 to 1947.

Moore was elected as a Republican to the 59th Congress to fill the vacancy caused by the death of George A. Castor.  He was re-elected seven times and served from November 6, 1906, to January 4, 1920, when he resigned to become the 109th mayor of Philadelphia.  He was a delegate to the 1920 Republican National Convention.

Elected in 1919, Moore first served as mayor of Philadelphia from 1920 to 1924. He was then appointed by the United States State Department as a delegate to the International Navigation Congress at Cairo, Egypt, in 1926.  After being defeated in 1927, he returned to the mayor's office in Philadelphia following a victory in the 1931 Philadelphia mayoral election, serving from 1932 to 1936 as its 111th incumbent.

Moore was responsible for Pennsylvania being one of only six states to be carried by President Herbert Hoover in his overwhelming defeat in the 1932 presidential election. The mayor was able to get enough Philadelphia voters out on Election Day to tip the state Republican, preserving an unbroken streak of Pennsylvania not voting Democrat in a presidential election since 1856 (this would end as the state was carried by President Franklin D. Roosevelt in the following 1936 presidential election.

During his terms as mayor, Moore banned the showing of films by Roscoe Arbuckle because the charges pending against Arbuckle for rape and murder would offend public morals. This motion occurred concurrent with Arbuckle's arrest, prior to Arbuckle's trial and eventual acquittal.

Legacy

Moore was one of three mayors of Philadelphia the city honored by naming a fireboat after him.

An elementary school, located at Summerdale and Longshore Avenues in Philadelphia, was built and named after him in the 1950's. It is still in operation today

Bibliography
Drayer, Robert E. "J. Hampton Moore: An Old Fashioned Republican." Ph.D. dissertation, University of Pennsylvania, 1961.

References

Further reading

The Political Graveyard

External links

 The J. Hampton Moore Papers, including correspondence, political papers, documents and other materials, are available for research use at the Historical Society of Pennsylvania.
 
 

1864 births
1950 deaths
Politicians from Woodbury, New Jersey
Mayors of Philadelphia
Republican Party members of the United States House of Representatives from Pennsylvania